White House Madness is a 1975 film directed by Mark L. Lester and starring Steve Friedman. The film is a satire of the Watergate scandal.

White House Madness enjoyed a relative upswing in public awareness in 1995 when it was revealed that Phil Gramm, a Republican senator from Texas at that time planning a presidential run, had invested money in the film.

Cast
Steve Friedman ... Richard M. Nixon
Dennis Fimple ... Bob Haldeman
Perry Cook ... John Mitchell
Rusty Blitz ... John Ehrlichman
Lesley Woods ... Pat Nixon
Merrie Lynn Ross ... Julie Nixon
Margaret Wheeler ... Mamie Eisenhower
Kathy Bellinger ... Tricia Nixon
Oaky Miller ... Ronald Ziegler
Patti Jerome ... Martha Mitchell
Peggy Stewart ... Rosemary Woods
Al Lewis ... Judge Cirrhosis (cf. Judge Sirica)
Del Hinkley ... Billy Graham
William Tregoe ... General Haig
George Skaff ... King Feisal

See also
 List of American films of 1975

External links

1975 films
Films directed by Mark L. Lester
1975 comedy films
American political comedy films
American satirical films
Films about Richard Nixon
1970s political comedy films
1970s English-language films
1970s American films